Forqueray is the surname of a family of baroque French musicians and composers, and may refer to one of these articles below:

 Antoine Forqueray (1672–1745), composer and virtuoso of the viola da gamba, father of Jean-Baptiste.
 Jean-Baptiste Forqueray (1699–1782), composer and player of the viola da gamba, son of Antoine.
 Nicolas Gilles Forqueray (1703–1761), composer, second son of Antoine
 Michel II Forqueray (1681–1757), composer and organist, brother of Antoine

See Also 
 Charles Fouqueray (1869–1956), painter (not related to the family)